Dhanaé Audet-Beaulieu is a graduate of Collège de Rosemont. He started in college co-directing a short film with Jonathan Bolduc and Louis Roy entitled Changer d’air winning both the public "Coup de cœur" and the "Jury Grand prix".

Professionally, he has acted in a number of popular Quebec television series, most importantly Les Lavigueur, la vraie histoire as well as acting on theater stage in Les messagers DO. He also produced and co-directed a documentary about slackline, an emerging balance discipline. He also took part in the 8th season of the well-known Quebec's TV serie Lance & Compte.

He was born in Notre-Dame-des-Bois, Quebec, Canada.

Filmography
2007: "Changer d'air" as Pierre-Philippe
2008: Les Lavigueur, la vraie histoire as Michel Lavigueur (TV series, 6 episodes)
2009: Pour toujours, les Canadiens! as William Lanctôt-Couture
2010: "Highlining California" as co-director of this documentary
2012: "Lance et Compte 8" as Michel Brassard (TV series, 10 episodes)

References

External links

Dhanaé Audet-Beaulieu on Cinoche site
Actor page on ''Les Lavigueur page on Radio-Canada site

1986 births
Living people
Canadian male film actors
Male actors from Quebec